The 2022–23 CONCACAF Nations League is the second season of the CONCACAF Nations League, an international association football competition involving the men's national teams of the 41 member associations of CONCACAF. The group phase of the tournament started on 2 June 2022, and the final tournament, which will decide the champions, will be played in 15 to 18 June 2023. On 20 March 2023, CONCACAF confirmed the dates for the Nations League Finals, 15 and 18 June 2021 with the venue confirmed as Allegiant Stadium in Paradise, Nevada. The Nations League also serves as a qualifier for the 2023 CONCACAF Gold Cup.

The United States are the defending champions.

Schedule
The format for the 2022–23 Nations League was announced by CONCACAF on 27 July 2020. Due to the 2022 FIFA World Cup in Qatar taking place at the end of the year, the league phase will be played in June 2022 and March 2023.

Format

Tiebreakers
The ranking of teams in each group was determined as follows (Regulations Article 12.3):

 Points obtained in all group matches (three points for a win, one for a draw, zero for a loss);
 Goal difference in all group matches;
 Number of goals scored in all group matches;
 Points obtained in the matches played between the teams in question;
 Goal difference in the matches played between the teams in question;
 Number of goals scored in the matches played between the teams in question;
 Number of away goals scored in the matches played between the teams in question (if the tie was only between two teams);
 Fair play points in all group matches (only one deduction could be applied to a player in a single match):
 Yellow card: −1 points;
 Indirect red card (second yellow card): −3 points;
 Direct red card: −4 points;
 Yellow card and direct red card: −5 points;
 Drawing of lots.

Seeding

All 41 CONCACAF national teams entered the competition. The four teams which finished bottom of each group in Leagues A and B from the 2019–20 season moved down a league, while the four teams which finished top of each group in Leagues B and C moved up. The remaining teams stayed in their respective leagues.

The draw for the league phase took place in Miami, Florida, United States on 4 April 2022, 19:00 EDT. Each of the League's draws began by randomly selecting a team from Pot 1 and placing them in Group A of their respective league. The draws continued by selecting the remaining teams from Pot 1 and positioning them into Groups B, C and D in sequential order. The same procedure was done for the remaining pots. Teams were seeded into pots using CONCACAF Ranking.

League A

Group A

Group B

Group C

Group D

League B

Group A

Group B

Group C

Group D

League C

Group A

Group B

Group C

Group D

Top goalscorers

References

External links

 
2022-23
2022–23 in CONCACAF football
June 2022 sports events in North America
March 2023 sports events in North America
June 2023 sports events in North America
Current association football seasons